This is a list of populated places in Sokoto State, Nigeria. It is not complete but includes the most populated cities, towns and villages.
Gwadabawa
Salame
Gigane
Asara
Chimmola
Mamman Suka
Gidan Kaya
Tambagarka
[[*G-Tudu (Gidan Tudu)
Arbukwe
Makwa
Gwazange
Satuka
Boto
Kiso
Kolfa
Kiwo-Allah
Kafin-Chana
Kafin-Sarki
Udan-Marki
Filask
Bamgi
Balle
Gurdan
Rafin-Kudu
Manu
Katami
Gande
Maikulki
Binji
Almaji
Sutti
Ayama
Illela
Rumji
T. Bako
Wamako
Dingyadi
Bodinga Chilgari
Shunni
Waura
Gada
Kurawa
Sabon Birni
Souloulou
Yerimawa
Makamawa
Gauro
Goronyo
Shinaka
Gigawa
Wurno
Marona
Rabah
Maikujera
Gandi
Tsamia
Bageya
Kelarel
Sainyinan Daji
Kunkundo
Yabawa
Lofa
Bwoka-Noma
Shagari
Jabo
Chakai
Dogon-Daji
Masana
Tambawel
Maikada
Masu
Kebbe
Kajiji
Birjingo

Cities and towns
Cities and towns
Sokoto